Scars of the Crucifix is the seventh studio album by American death metal band Deicide. It was released on February 23, 2004, Deicide's first album on the band's new label Earache Records. The track "Scars of the Crucifix" spawned Deicide's first ever music video, filmed in Nottingham. This is the final Deicide album to feature the band's full original lineup, as the Hoffman brothers would both depart shortly after this album—ending their 17-year tenure with the group.

The closing track, "The Pentecostal", is followed by a hidden untitled bonus track with drummer/composer Steve Asheim playing a classical piano solo. 

On July 11, 2006, Brave Words & Bloody Knuckles reported that Deicide received a Silver Disc from the independent music trade body Impala for their sales in Europe.

The song "Fuck Your God" was used heavily as a torture method for detainees in Iraq by being piped into their bunks to induce sleep deprivation.

Track listing

Personnel
Glen Benton – bass, vocals
Eric Hoffman – guitars
Brian Hoffman – guitars
Steve Asheim – drums, piano (at end of "The Pentecostal")
Neil Kernon – production

References

Deicide (band) albums
2004 albums
Earache Records albums
Albums produced by Neil Kernon